Year 1109 (MCIX) was a common year starting on Friday (link will display the full calendar) of the Julian calendar.

Events 
By place 

 Levant 
 July 12 – Siege of Tripoli: After a 7-year siege (supported by the Genoese fleet), Tripoli falls to the Crusaders. Fakhr al-Mulk ibn Ammar, qadi of Tripoli, submits to Bertrand of Toulouse (the eldest son of Raymond IV). He establishes the County of Tripoli, the fourth Crusader state in the Middle East. Bertrand deposes Raymond's nephew William II (Jordan) as nominal count of Tripoli, who dies of an arrow wound sustained during the siege.

 Europe 
 Summer – Almoravid emir Ali ibn Yusuf organizes a public ritual of penance (auto-da-fé) of the works of Al-Ghazali, in front of the Great Mosque of Cordoba.
 July 1 – Urraca of León becomes queen of León, Castile and Galicia after the death of her father, King Alfonso VI (the Brave). She marries Alfonso I (the Battler).
 August 10 – Battle of Nakło: Bolesław III (Wrymouth) leads an expedition into Pomerania. He besieges the castle of Nakło, and defeats a Pomeranian relief force.
 August 24
Siege of Głogów: German forces led by King Henry V besiege Głogów. He is forced to abandon the siege – due to attacks of Polish guerilla warriors.
 Battle of Hundsfeld: Bolesław III defeats the imperial forces under Henry V at Hundsfeld (Silesia). The Germans are ambushed by the Polish forces. 
 The Almoravid army, led by Ali ibn Yusuf, fails to reconquer Toledo (lost in 1085).

 By topic 

 Education 
 Anselm of Laon, French monk and theologian, becomes chancellor of the cathedral at Laon (approximate date).

Births 
 July 25 – Afonso I (the Conqueror), king of Portugal (d. 1185)
 September 7 – Gongye, Korean queen (d. 1183)
 October 29 – Injong of Goryeo, Korean king (d. 1146)
 Abu'l-Hasan al-Hasan ibn Ali, Zirid emir (d. 1171)
 Al-Rashid, caliph of the Abbasid Caliphate (d. 1138)
 Béla II (the Blind), king of Hungary and Croatia (d. 1141)
 Bertrand de Blanchefort, French Grand Master (d. 1169)
 William d'Aubigny, 1st Earl of Arundel (d. 1176)

Deaths 
 January 26 – Alberic of Cîteaux, French abbot
 April 14 – Fulk IV (the Quarreler), count of Anjou (b. 1043)
 April 21 – Anselm, archbishop of Canterbury (b. 1033)
 April 28 – Hugh the Great, abbot of Cluny (b. 1024)
 May 12 – Dominic de la Calzada, Spanish priest (b. 1019)
 July 1 – Alfonso VI (the Brave), king of León and Castile
 September 21 – Svatopluk (the Lion), duke of Bohemia 
 November 16 – Ingulf, Norman Benedictine abbot
 Eupraxia of Kiev (Praxedis), Holy Roman Empress
 Ngok Loden Sherab, Tibetan Buddhist monk (b. 1059)
 William II (Jordan), count of Cerdagne and Tripoli

References